A combination puzzle, also known as a sequential move puzzle, is a puzzle which consists of a set of pieces which can be manipulated into different combinations by a group of operations.  Many such puzzles are mechanical puzzles of polyhedral shape, consisting of multiple layers of pieces along each axis which can rotate independently of each other.  Collectively known as twisty puzzles, the archetype of this kind of puzzle is the Rubik's Cube.  Each rotating side is usually marked with different colours, intended to be scrambled, then 'solved' by a sequence of moves that sort the facets by colour. As a generalisation, combination puzzles also include mathematically defined examples that have not been, or are impossible to, physically construct.

Description
A combination puzzle is solved by achieving a particular combination starting from a random (scrambled) combination. Often, the solution is required to be some recognisable pattern such as "all like colours together" or "all numbers in order".  The most famous of these puzzles is the original Rubik's Cube, a cubic puzzle in which each of the six faces can be independently rotated.  Each of the six faces is a different colour, but each of the nine pieces on a face is identical in colour, in the solved condition.  In the unsolved condition colours are distributed amongst the pieces of the cube.  Puzzles like the Rubik's Cube which are manipulated by rotating a section of pieces are popularly called twisty puzzles. They are often face-turning, but commonly exist in corner-turning and edge-turning varieties.

The mechanical construction of the puzzle will usually define the rules by which the combination of pieces can be altered.  This leads to some limitations on what combinations are possible.  For instance, in the case of the Rubik's Cube, there are a large number of combinations that can be achieved by randomly placing the coloured stickers on the cube, but not all of these can be achieved by manipulating the cube rotations.  Similarly, not all the combinations that are mechanically possible from a disassembled cube are possible by manipulation of the puzzle.  Since neither unpeeling the stickers nor disassembling the cube is an allowed operation, the possible operations of rotating various faces limit what can be achieved.

Although a mechanical realization of the puzzle is usual, it is not actually necessary.  It is only necessary that the rules for the operations are defined.  The puzzle can be realized entirely in virtual space or as a set of mathematical statements.  In fact, there are some puzzles that can only be realized in virtual space.  An example is the 4-dimensional 3×3×3×3 tesseract puzzle, simulated by the MagicCube4D software.

Types
There have been many different shapes of Rubik type puzzles constructed.  As well as cubes, all of the regular polyhedra and many of the semi-regular and stellated polyhedra have been made.

Regular cuboids
A cuboid is a rectilinear polyhedron.  That is, all its edges form right angles.  Or in other words (in the majority of cases), a box shape.  A regular cuboid, in the context of this article, is a cuboid puzzle where all the pieces are the same size in edge length. Pieces are often referred to as "cubies".

Pattern variations 
There are many puzzles which are mechanically identical to the regular cuboids listed above but have variations in the pattern and colour of design.  Some of these are custom made in very small numbers, sometimes for promotional events. The ones listed in the table below are included because the pattern in some way affects the difficulty of the solution or is notable in some other way.

Irregular cuboids 
An irregular cuboid, in the context of this article, is a cuboid puzzle where not all the pieces are the same size in edge length.  This category of puzzle is often made by taking a larger regular cuboid puzzle and fusing together some of the pieces to make larger pieces.  In the formulae for piece configuration, the configuration of the fused pieces is given in brackets.  Thus, (as a simple regular cuboid example) a 2(2,2)x2(2,2)x2(2,2) is a 2×2×2 puzzle, but it was made by fusing a 4×4×4 puzzle.  Puzzles which are constructed in this way are often called "bandaged" cubes.  However, there are many irregular cuboids that have not (and often could not) be made by bandaging.

Other polyhedra

Other geometric shapes

Non-Rubik style three-dimensional

Two-dimensional

Geared puzzles

See also 

 N-dimensional sequential move puzzles
 Puck puzzle
 List of Rubik's Cube manufacturers

References

External links

A large database of twisty puzzles
The Puzzle Museum
The Magic Polyhedra Patent Page

 
Puzzles
Mechanical puzzles